Uraman Takht Rural District is a rural district (dehestan) in Uraman District, Sarvabad County, Kurdistan Province, Iran. At the 2006 census, its population was 4,926, in 1,140 families. The rural district has 5 villages.

References 

Rural Districts of Kurdistan Province
Sarvabad County